The German Builder's House is a historic house at 315 East Central Street in Siloam Springs, Arkansas.  It is a two-story brick I-house, with a side gable roof and a rear wood-frame addition, giving it an overall T shape.  A porch with open veranda above spans most of the width of the main facade, with Queen Anne style turned posts and balusters, and a spindled frieze.  The house was built c. 1880 by German masons from St. Louis who were working on a nearby school building.  It is one of the finest brick I-houses in Benton County.

The house was listed on the National Register of Historic Places in 1988.

See also
National Register of Historic Places listings in Benton County, Arkansas

References

German-American culture in Arkansas
Houses on the National Register of Historic Places in Arkansas
Houses completed in 1880
Houses in Siloam Springs, Arkansas
National Register of Historic Places in Benton County, Arkansas